The 2009 Speedway Grand Prix of Czech Republic the first race of the 2009 Speedway Grand Prix season. It took place on 25 April in the Markéta Stadium in Prague, Czech Republic. Czech Republic Grand Prix was won by Russian rider Emil Sayfutdinov.

Riders 

The Speedway Grand Prix Commission nominated Matěj Kůs as Wild Card, and Luboš Tomíček, Jr. and Adrian Rymel both as Track Reserves. The riders' starting positions draw for Grand Prix meeting was made on 24 April at 13:00 CET by Mayor of Prague Pavel Bém.

Heat details

Heat after heat 
 (65.53) Pedersen, Gollob, Adams, Ułamek
 (64.72) Lindgren, Jonsson, Harris, Hancock (E/start)
 (64.58) Crump, Sayfutdinov, Bjerre, Kůs
 (64.81) Holta, Nicholls, Andersen, Walasek
 (65.31) Bjerre, Gollob, Harris, Nicholls
 (64.23) Jonsson, Andersen, Adams, Sayfutdinov
 (64.71) Ułamek, Hancock, Kůs, Holta
 (65.03) Pedersen, Lindgren, Crump, Walasek
 (64.97) Walasek, Jonsson, Gollob, Kůs
 (64.61) Adams, Crump, Harris, Holta
 (65.19) Lindgren, Bjerre, Andersen, Ułamek
 (64.68) Hancock, Sayfutdinov, Nicholls, Pedersen
 (64.31) Hancock, Crump, Andersen, Gollob
 (64.59) Adams, Lindgren, Nicholls, Kůs
 (64.01) Sayfutdinov, Walasek, Harris, Ułamek
 (64.80) Bjerre, Pedersen, Jonsson, Holta
 (65.08) Lindgren, Gollob, Sayfutdinov, Holta
 (64.94) Adams, Hancock, Walasek, Bjerre
 (64.67) Jonsson, Ułamek, Crump, Nicholls
 (?) Pedersen, Harris, Andersen, Kůs
 Semi-Finals:
 (64.82) Crump, Lindgren, Bjerre, Jonsson
 (65.57) Sayfutdinov, Adams, Pedersen, Hancock Sayfutdinov falls on first heat - all 4 riders restart.
 The Final:
 (64.44) Sayfutdinov, Lindgren, Crump, Adams

The intermediate classification

See also 
 Speedway Grand Prix
 List of Speedway Grand Prix riders

References

External links 
 FIM-live.com 

Czech Republic
2009